Scopula sublutescens is a moth of the  family Geometridae. It is found in India (Assam).

References

Moths described in 1920
sublutescens
Moths of Asia